Sara Corning (March 16, 1872 May 5, 1969) was a Canadian nurse and humanitarian.

Early life
Corning was born in Chegoggin, Nova Scotia, the daughter Captain Samuel and Delilah (Churchill) Corning. She trained as a nurse in New Hampshire.  Sara is listed as a graduate of the Mary Hitchcock Memorial Hospital School of Nursing in Hanover, New Hampshire in 1899.

Career
She joined the U.S. Red Cross during the First World War and subsequently signed on with Near East Relief. In 1919, Corning was stationed at an orphanage near Yerevan in the recently-declared Republic of Armenia. She next worked as an aid worker at Anatolia College in Merzifon, Turkey. In 1922, Corning travelled to Constantinople, where Near East Relief was headquartered. At the end of 1922, Corning was sent to Smyrna. While the Turkish army was capturing the city, Corning gathered orphaned children and led them through the city to safety aboard an American ship, where they were then taken to Constantinople. She later established an orphanage for the children on the Greek island of Syros.

In June 1923, King George II of Greece presented her with the Order of the Knights of St. Xavier for her courage and bravery.

Death
Corning later retired and moved back to her childhood home and died in Yarmouth on May 5, 1969.

Posthumous recognition

In 2004, Karekin II, the current Catholicos of All Armenians, the supreme head of the Armenian Apostolic Church, gave a Message of Blessing, which contained a tribute to Corning. She is the namesake to the Sara Corning Centre for Genocide Education in Toronto, Ontario.

In a ceremony on September 14, 2019 attended by the Hon. Arthur J. LeBlanc, Lieutenant Governor of Nova Scotia, and by Anahit Harutyunyan, ambassador to Canada of Armenia, the Sara Corning Society unveiled a statue of Corning behind the Yarmouth County Museum and Archives complex on the former site of the Zion United Baptist Church, which Corning attended in her lifetime. The statue will be a permanent fixture outside the Museum.

References

External link

1872 births
Canadian humanitarians
Women humanitarians
People from Yarmouth County
1969 deaths